A taraf is a small folk (lăutărească) music ensemble from Romania or Moldova, usually consisting of 3-8 musicians.  Instruments include the violin, cello, tambourine, accordion, harmonica and cimpoi (Romanian bagpipes).  Tarafs also often include an instrument typical to the region: a kobza and cimbalom (Wallachia and Oltenia) a trumpet and flute (Moldova), a Tárogató (near Banat), a clarinet (Transylvania), or a 2-3 stringed lute (in Maramureş county) sometimes called a "zongora".  Players may also use instruments improvised from grass, birch bark, mussel shells, and leaves.

Famous tarafs
The group Taraf de Haïdouks, introduced to the West in the 1990s, brought the word to international fame.

External links
 A Russian- and Romanian-language radio broadcast, with an interview of and music by a Transylvanian taraf

References

Romanian music
Moldovan musical groups